The neutralizing domain is a specific site or section of the Human Immunodeficiency Virus(HIV) (most commonly on the envelope protein gp120) that elicits antibodies with neutralizing activity.

See also
 V3 loop
 Human Immunodeficiency Virus

References

External links
 Neutralizing domain in the external envelope glycoprotein of SIVmac251, NLM Gateway
 Principal neutralizing domain of the human immunodeficiency virus type 1 envelope protein, PNAS

HIV/AIDS